Corrimal railway station is located on the South Coast railway line in New South Wales, Australia. It serves the Northern Wollongong suburb of Corrimal and opened on 21 June 1887.

Platforms & services
Corrimal has two side platforms serviced by NSW TrainLink South Coast line services travelling from Waterfall and Thirroul to Port Kembla. Some peak hour and late night services operate to Sydney Central, Bondi Junction and Kiama.

References

External links

Corrimal station details Transport for New South Wales

Buildings and structures in Wollongong
Easy Access railway stations in New South Wales
Railway stations in Australia opened in 1887
Regional railway stations in New South Wales